Jewish Life Television (JLTV) is an American entertainment television network broadcasting Jewish–themed programming.  The network was founded in 2007 by Phil Blazer, a longtime journalist and producer of programming for the Jewish community; Blazer remained with the network until his death in August 2020.

In the United States, JLTV is available in almost 50 million households through Comcast, Spectrum and DirecTV as well as various regional cable systems, in addition to offering a live feed of its programming on the Internet. JLTV's broadcast facilities are located in Los Angeles, California.

Programming
JLTV's newest programming features shows, such as international favorites Fauda and Prisoners of War alongside many other news, sports, lifestyle and entertainment programming.  These include films, documentaries, music, reviews, interviews, reality shows such as InOverOurHeads and special events, such as programming from the Maccabiah Games.

In 2019, the network launched the original series, Bubbies Know Best, featuring three Jewish grandmothers serving as matchmakers for a variety of people searching for romance. The network also carries a collection of classic general-interest series with Jewish hosts or leads, including The Jack Benny Program, That Show with Joan Rivers, Candid Camera with Allen Funt, You Bet Your Life with Groucho Marx, The Soupy Sales Show, Bonanza (Lorne Greene and Michael Landon), the Ukrainian sitcom Servant of the People (Volodymyr Zelenskyy) and the mid-20th century dramedy The Goldbergs, along with general-interest public domain Westerns and sitcoms (The Lucy Show, The Beverly Hillbillies, Stories of the Century and Annie Oakley).

Canadian distribution
In 2011, JLTV was officially added to the CRTC's approved list of foreign services, allowing the channel to expand into Canada. Ethnic Channels Group, who sponsored the application to get JLTV on the approved list, is the official Canadian distributor of the channel. In July 2014, JLTV officially launched in Canada on Bell Fibe TV.

References

External links
 

Jewish television networks
Religious television stations in the United States
Television channels and stations established in 2007